Famil Jamalov (born on 8 April 1998) is an Azerbaijani footballer who plays as a forward for Turan-Tovuz in the Azerbaijan Premier League.

Club career
On 12 September 2021, Jamalov made his debut in the Azerbaijan Premier League for Neftçi match against Qarabağ.

References

External links
 

1998 births
Living people
Association football forwards
Azerbaijani footballers
Azerbaijan youth international footballers
Azerbaijan Premier League players
Neftçi PFK players
Turan-Tovuz IK players